The Silurian McKenzie Formation is a mapped bedrock unit in Maryland.

Description
The McKenzie Formation is a gray, thin-bedded shale and argillaceous limestone, with interbedded red sandstone and shale in its eastern extents in Maryland. The thickness ranges from 160 to 380 feet. It houses shallow water fauna including but not limited to brachiopods, Ostracods, and tentaculitids.

Age
Relative age dating of the Tuscarora places it in the Silurian period. It rests conformably atop the Clinton Group and conformably below the Bloomsburg Formation.

References

Silurian Maryland
Silurian West Virginia
Silurian geology of Virginia
Silurian southern paleotemperate deposits
Ludfordian